Lawn Lake Dam was an earthen dam in Rocky Mountain National Park, United States that failed on July 15, 1982, at about 6 a.m., in an event known as the flood of 1982.

Lawn Lake

Dam failure
Over the years the road that had been cut to permit construction of the dam fell into disrepair and ceased to exist. Because of the dam's remote and difficult location, inspection and repairs lapsed. The Colorado State Engineer determined that the probable cause of the dam failure was deterioration of lead caulking on the joint between the outlet pipe and the gate valve leading to internal erosion of the earth-fill dam. There had been issues reported during inspections in 1951, 1975, 1977 and 1978.

At this rate, the lake emptied in about half an hour. When the waters reached the broader valley of Fall River at Horseshoe Park they spread out and slowed, leaving behind a large alluvial fan of debris. The flood continued down Fall River and hit the Cascade Dam which stored water to run a hydroelectric plant about a mile (2 km) downstream. Cascade Dam failed from the onslaught and added its waters to the flood. The Aspenglen campground was destroyed and two campers who returned to recover camping gear lost their lives, due to insufficient warning from park rangers.

The flood entered the town of Estes Park and caused severe damage to 177 downtown businesses (75 percent of Estes Park's commercial activity).  In Estes Park the flood joined the Big Thompson River and flowed into Lake Estes on the eastern edge of the city.  Olympus Dam, part of the Colorado-Big Thompson Project, there withstood the deluge and the flood was halted.

Aftermath
The scar left by the scouring of Roaring River and the alluvial fan at Horseshoe Park are still very apparent 37 years later and will remain for a very long time . Twenty-five years after the accident, the extent of the former reservoir is still clearly evident, and at the mouth of the lake, the start of the Roaring River flows through the location of the former dam.

As a consequence of the dam failure, aging dams at Pear Reservoir, Bluebird Lake and Sandbeach Lake in the park were demolished and removed.

References

 Hydrology, Geomorphology, and Dam-break Modeling of the July 15, 1982, Lawn Lake Dam and Cascade Lake Dam Failures, Larimer County, Colorado.

Dams in Colorado
Buildings and structures in Larimer County, Colorado
Buildings and structures in Rocky Mountain National Park
Dam failures in the United States
Disasters in Colorado
Estes Park, Colorado
1982 in Colorado
1982 disasters in the United States
1903 establishments in Colorado
1982 disestablishments in Colorado
Former reservoirs